Platanakia, known before 1922 as Sugova / Shugovo is a village in Serres, Greece. It is situated in the municipal unit of Kerkini, in the Sintiki municipality, within the Serres region of Central Macedonia. The village had 697 inhabitants according to the 2001 census. The population was 444 according to the 2011 census.

Geography 
The village is located in the southern foothills of Belasitsa, near the Bulgarian-North Macedonian border.

History

In the Ottoman Empire 

In the Ottoman tax summary list of non-Muslim population of the province Timur Hisara from 1616-1617 year the village of Shugova is noted as having 133  households that are liable for jizya charcoal tax. 

In the XIX century Shugovo is a village within the Demirhisar Kaza  of the Sanjak of Serres in the Ottoman Empire. In " Ethnography of the Provinces of Adrianople, Monastir and Thessaloniki ", published in Constantinople in 1878 and reflecting the statistics of the male population from 1873, Shugovo (Chougovo) is listed as a village with 250 households and 300 Muslims and 340 Bulgarians . 

In 1891 Georgi Strezov wrote:

According to the statistics of Vasil Kanchov ("Macedonia. Ethnography and Statistics") by 1900 the village was inhabited 850 Bulgarian Christians and 500 Turks. 

The entire population of the village is under the rule of the Bulgarian Exarchate. According to the secretary of the Exarchate Dimitar Mishev ( " La Macédoine et sa Population Chrétienne ") in 1905 the population of Shugovo (Chougovo) is 1800. Bulgarians Exarchists in Bulgarian village operates a primary school with one teacher and 41 students. 

At the outbreak of the Balkan War in 1912, twenty-seven people from Shugovo volunteered for the Macedonian-Edirne militia.

Under Greek sovereignty 
During the First Balkan War the village was under Bulgarian control, but after the Second Balkan War in 1913 it was incorporated within Greece. Greek refugees are settled in the village. According to the 1928 census, Sugovo is a mixed local refugee village with 254 refugee families with 876 people.  In 1922, the name of the village was changed to Platanakia.

References

Bibliography

External links 

 Aerial photo of Platanakia

Populated places in Serres (regional unit)